South Brunswick is the name of several places in the United States:

South Brunswick Township, New Jersey
South Brunswick, North Carolina is the most southeastern corner of North Carolina and encompasses: Shallotte, NC, Ocean Isle Beach, NC, Sunset Beach, NC, and the "famous seafood capital of the world" Calabash, NC

See also 
Brunswick (disambiguation)